Michelle Nicole Creber (born September 7, 1999) is a Canadian actress and singer who is best known as the voice of Apple Bloom (and the singing voice of Sweetie Belle until 2013) in the TV series My Little Pony: Friendship Is Magic.

Biography
Creber was born to jazz pianist/producer Michael Creber and vocalist/producer Monique Creber. She first appeared on stage with her parents at the age of one and since then has performed in several movies, TV shows, musicals, and animation series.

Other notable voiceover credits include "Lucy" in Peanuts (Warner Bros), "Alice" in Martha Speaks (PBS Kids), and "Wendy" in the New Adventures of Peter Pan (Discovery Family). Notable onscreen credits include "Kelly" in the gritty Western series Strange Empire (CBC/Netflix), Supernatural (CW), Smart Cookies (Hallmark), Killer Among Us (Lifetime), Christmas Lodge (Showcase), The Haunting Hour (The Hub), Eureka (NBC), and The Search For Santa Paws (Disney). Creber has also performed extensively in the theatre world with many lead roles, including twice in the title role of Annie and "Dorothy" in The Wizard of Oz. A professional singer since the age of four, she has recorded lead vocals on over a dozen albums in addition to the soundtracks for many TV shows and movies.

On August 28, 2012, Creber released her first solo CD entitled Timeless: Songs of a Century. On December 1, 2012, she followed up the release with A Creber Christmas, featuring her entire family and popular musicians of the brony community. The album at Home (an acoustic collection of covers and originals featuring Creber, her parents, Gabriel Brown, and Andrea Libman) was released in November 2014. The summer of 2015 saw the release of Tribute: Celebrating the Music of Michael Jackson, featuring Creber and Gabriel Brown (aka Black Gryph0n). On May 1, 2016, she released Getting Stronger, an album of originals with Gabriel Brown. Recent lead singing features include the theme song for NBCs Nina's World; three albums with Gabriel Brown; Hasbro albums Songs of Ponyville, It's A Pony Kind of Christmas, and Songs of Harmony; and a duet with Billy Joel for the Hallmark movie Just the Way You Are.

Creber frequently contributes to the brony community showing up to several brony conventions across the United States. She also has appearted internationally: BUCKcon at Manchester, UK, in 2013; GalaCon at Ludwigsburg, Germany, in 2015 and 2017; PonyCongress at Elbląg, Poland, in 2016; and Project SeaPonyCon at Bangkok, Thailand, in 2017. She also had her own Internet radio show, Saturday Night Songs, on the defunct brony media network, "Everfree Network."

Filmography

Animation

Live action

Musicals
 2008 – A Christmas Carol – Tiny Tim
 2009 – Annie – Annie (EV Young Award: Most Outstanding Performance)
 2009 – Grease – Kenickie
 2010 – Guys and Dolls – Nicely-Nicely Johnson
 2010 – The Sound of Music – Brigitta Von Trapp
 2010 – Annie – Annie
 2011 – The Wonderful Wizard of Oz – Dorothy Gale
 2016 – Fame – Lambchops (Ovation Award: Outstanding Performance in a Musical)
 2017 – 13: The Musical – Lucy
 2017 – Little Women: The Broadway Musical – Jo

Discography
 Timeless: Songs of a Century (2012) – feat. Daniel Ingram, Andrew Stein (MandoPony), Natalie Sharp & Yoav Landau (The Living Tombstone)
 A Creber Christmas (2012) with Michael & Monique Creber / feat. Andrew Stein & Natalie Sharp
 At Home (2014) with Gabriel C. Brown (Black Gryph0n), Andrea Libman, Michael Creber & Monique Creber
 Zero Gravity (2014) feat. Gabriel C. Brown (Black Gryph0n) and Baasik
 Tribute: Celebrating the Music of Michael Jackson (2015) with Gabriel C. Brown
 Getting Stronger (2016) with Gabriel C. Brown
 On Display (2018) feat. Gabriel C. Brown & Natalie Sharp
 Work in Progress (2019)
 Storm (2020)
 Michelle & Claire's Spectacular, Stupendous, Spookalicous Halloween EP (2020) with Claire Corlett (Digital Only)
 A Creber Christmas Vol. 2 (Let There Be Peace) (2020) (Digital Only)

See also
 My Little Pony: Friendship Is Magic
 My Little Pony: Friendship Is Magic fandom
 BronyCon

References

External links

 
 
 Michelle Creber on YouTube

1999 births
Living people
21st-century Canadian actresses
21st-century Canadian women singers
Actresses from Vancouver
Canadian child actresses
Canadian female dancers
Canadian television actresses
Canadian voice actresses
Musicians from Vancouver